Robert Charles Edward DeLong (born February 18, 1986) is an American electronic musician from Bothell, Washington and currently residing in Los Angeles, California. With a background in percussion and influences from a number of indie rock bands, DeLong's primary genres include house, dubstep, and moombahton.  He has released three full-length albums on Glassnote Records: Just Movement in January 2013, In the Cards in September 2015, and Walk Like Me in November 2021.

Early life 
DeLong grew up in the Seattle suburb of Bothell. His father was a drummer. Robert played in various bands while he was in high school. He studied drums at Azusa Pacific University, partially supported by a scholarship. While in college, he played in the band The Denouement and settled in Los Angeles after graduation.

Music career 
DeLong started as a drummer for indie rock bands but added more electronic elements to his compositions following his exposure to their use at raves. DeLong is notable for using video-game peripherals, such as a Wii remote and a joystick, connected to a MIDI interface, to modify his sound. He cites as influences Death Cab for Cutie, Modest Mouse, Dreamers, and Boards of Canada, among others. He released his first full-length album, Just Movement, on Glassnote Records on 5 February 2013.  His sound has been described by Wired Magazine as a merger of "electronic dance music, alt rock, and vocals into tracks that are poppy enough to make you move but dissonant enough to be interesting." At live performances, facepaint is offered to fans; volunteer local artists organized and led by DeLong's longtime partner, visual artist Heidi Callaway, do the actual facepainting. Facepaint is a regular fixture of DeLong's performances and creates a sense of community amongst fans.  His equipment and clothing feature an orange "X" logo; this same logo, or a variant of it, is often painted on his face and those in attendance.

Discography

Studio albums

Singles

References

External links 

 Official Robert DeLong website
 
 
 
 
 Robert DeLong on Glassnote Records

1986 births
Living people
American dance musicians
American electronic musicians
American male singer-songwriters
Azusa Pacific University alumni
Singer-songwriters from Washington (state)
People from Bothell, Washington
21st-century American singers
21st-century American male singers
Glassnote Records artists